JCN may refer to:

 Job Creators Network, a conservative U.S. advocacy group
 Journal of Clinical Nursing, a monthly peer-reviewed medical journal covering all aspects of nursing
 Judicial Crisis Network, an American conservative advocacy organization based in the United States
 JCN, the station code for Clarkson railway station, Perth, Western Australia, Australia